The Alor Gajah British Graveyard is a notable historical place in Alor Gajah town, Malacca, Malaysia.

See also
 List of tourist attractions in Malacca

References

Cemeteries in Malacca